The 22439/22440 New Delhi - Shri Mata Vaishno Devi Katra Vande Bharat Express is India's 2nd Vande Bharat Express train, connecting the states of New Delhi, Haryana, Punjab and Jammu and Kashmir.

Overview 
This train is operated by Indian Railways, connecting New Delhi, Ambala Cantt. Jn, Ludhiana Jn, Jammu Tawi and Shri Mata Vaishno Devi Katra. It is currently operated with train numbers 22439/22440 on 6 days a week basis.

Rakes 
It is the second 1st Generation train of Vande Bharat Expresses and was designed and manufactured by the Integral Coach Factory (ICF) under the leadership of Sudhanshu Mani at Perambur, Chennai under the Make in India initiative.

Coach Composition 
The 22439/22440 New Delhi - Shri Mata Vaishno Devi Katra Vande Bharat Express currently has 14 AC Chair Car and 2 Executive Chair Cars coaches.

The coaches in Aqua color indicate AC Chair Cars and the coaches in Pink color indicate AC Executive Chair Cars.

Service 
The Maximum Permissible Speed (MPS) given is 130 km/hr.

Schedule 
The schedule of this 22439/22440 New Delhi - Shri Mata Vaishno Devi Katra Vande Bharat Express is given below:-

See also 

 Vande Bharat Express
 Tejas Express
 Gatimaan Express
 New Delhi railway station
 Shri Mata Vaishno Devi Katra railway station

References 

Vande Bharat Express trains
Named passenger trains of India
Higher-speed rail
Express trains in India
 
Transport in Delhi
Rail transport in Delhi
Transport in Katra, Jammu and Kashmir

